Einar Rothman (3 January 1888 – 3 September 1952) was a Swedish track and field athlete who competed in the 1908 Summer Olympics.

In 1908 he finished sixth in the 3500 metre walk competition. In the 10 mile walk event he was eliminated in the first round.

References

External links
profile

1888 births
1952 deaths
Swedish male racewalkers
Olympic athletes of Sweden
Athletes (track and field) at the 1908 Summer Olympics